Fostoria station is a former train station in Fostoria, Ohio.

History
The station building was constructed by the Baltimore and Ohio Railroad. It opened in March 1907. Baltimore and Ohio services ended in 1971.

When Amtrak rerouted the Broadway Limited in 1990, Fostoria was selected as a stop on the line. The city pledged $65,000 to refurbish the station, platform, and parking lot for the new service. The Broadway Limited served the station between 1990 and 1995. Amtrak again reactivated the stop on December 15, 1997, for the Three Rivers. Passenger service finally ceased in 2005.

References

Fostoria, Ohio
Buildings and structures in Seneca County, Ohio
Former Baltimore and Ohio Railroad stations
Former Amtrak stations in Ohio
Railway stations in the United States opened in 1907
Railway stations closed in 1971
Railway stations in the United States opened in 1990
Railway stations closed in 1995
Railway stations in the United States opened in 1997
Railway stations closed in 2005